Stephanie Beaumont (born 26 March 1974) is a Canadian female country music artist. Beaumont first came to success with her 1996 debut album, Love & Dreams. Her second album, co-produced by singer-songwriter Jeffrey Steele, Way Over My Heart, was released in 1998. Both albums gave Beaumont numerous Canadian Country Music Association nominations including Rising Star and Female Vocalist. She also won Outstanding New Female Artist from the RPM Big Country Awards in 1999. Beaumont has also co-hosted Ottawa, Ontario's A Morning news program. Beaumont is the CEO and President of Sea And Be Scene.com—an entertainment based, magazine style website designed to celebrate Canada's four Atlantic Provinces.

Discography

Albums

Singles

References

Canadian women country singers
Living people
Musicians from Halifax, Nova Scotia
1974 births